Zhang Zhenhuan may refer to:
 Zhang Zhenhuan (general)
 Zhang Zhenhuan (actor)